The 2009–10 season was Colchester United's 68th season in their history and second successive season in the third tier of English football, League One. Alongside competing in the League One, the club also participated in the FA Cup, the League Cup and the Football League Trophy.

Following a famous 7–1 opening day win at Norwich City, manager Paul Lambert left Colchester for the Canaries under a storm surrounding compensation. Aidy Boothroyd was later appointed Lambert's successor and the club spent most of the season in the play-off positions. A late season collapse in form meant the U's dropped out of the play-offs with seven games remaining, but were not able to return, eventually finishing in eighth, eight points shy of the play-offs. Eighth place was still the fourth best-ever league result in the club's history.

In the cups, Colchester were eliminated in the first rounds of the League Cup and Football League Trophy, but progressed to the third round of the FA Cup. After beating Bromley and then Hereford United, Colchester faced Preston North End but were beaten 7–0 at Deepdale following five second half goals.

Season overview
Paul Lambert vowed he would have a mass clear out of players over the summer as each player was called in to meet him to discuss their future before May was over. He had identified his transfer targets with chairman Robbie Cowling willing to fund those ambitions. Incoming were Ashley Vincent, following a loan spell last season, as well as Lee Beevers, David Fox, Magnus Okuonghae and Ben Williams, all on permanent deals. Outgoing was Mark Yeates, last season's top scorer, who joined Middlesbrough for £450,000.

Lambert's contracted outcasts were consigned to training with the youth team and denied squad numbers and a place in the squad photo. Chris Coyne left the club to return to his native Australia, while Jamie Guy, Matt Heath, Philip Ifil, Johnnie Jackson, Matt Lockwood and John White were all among those affected by Lambert's managerial tactics. He then brought in Hamilton Academical forward Joël Thomas in a long protracted transfer deal for £125,000.

Three days prior to the season opener against Norwich City, the club announced the signing of former striker Kevin Lisbie on loan from Ipswich Town. He scored twice on his second debut for the club as Colchester thrashed Norwich 7–1 at Carrow Road. A week later, Colchester remained at the top of League One following a 2–1 win over Yeovil Town. Norwich City contacted Robbie Cowling following the game asking to approach Lambert regarding their vacant manager position after they had sacked Bryan Gunn following the U's famous victory. Cowling initially refused, but later relented with Lambert declaring his interest in joining City. Cowling offered Lambert the chance to talk to Norwich on the proviso no offer could be accepted until compensation was discussed and agreed between the two clubs. Compensation was never agreed and Lambert resigned with Colchester due to host Gillingham the same day. Lambert's assistants Ian Culverhouse and Gary Karsa also resigned the day after his appointment at Norwich.

Cowling vowed to take Norwich to a Football League tribunal. In the meantime, former Watford manager Aidy Boothroyd was unveiled on 3 September as Lambert's replacement. He enjoyed a nine game unbeaten run following his appointment, while making the loan signings of Danny Batth, Kayode Odejayi and John-Joe O'Toole. The latter two were then signed on a permanent basis in the January transfer window.

With the Lambert compensation issue still continuing into January, and with the U's set to host Lambert's Norwich in the league, Cowling refused to allocate additional tickets to the travelling Norwich fans for the fixture. Cowling claimed he would prefer the stadium have an empty seat than one occupied by another Norwich City fan. The game itself attracted a record attendance of 10,064, but Norwich gained revenge over the U's, winning 5–0 on the day.

At the end of February, Colchester's form took a negative turn, suffering an eight game winless run and dropped from third place to seventh and outside of the play-off places for only the second time this season. With seven games remaining, Colchester were unable to make a return to the play-off spots and would eventually finish eighth, eight points away from the play-offs, yet a result that was their fourth best-ever league result.

Colchester were eliminated from the League Cup in the first round by Leyton Orient, while Gillingham beat the U's following a penalty shoot-out in the Football League Trophy. In the FA Cup, the U's beat Bromley and Hereford United on their way to the third round, but were heavily beaten 7–0 at Deepdale by Preston North End in the game prior to their 5–0 home defeat by Norwich.

Players

Transfers

In

 Total spending:  ~ £185,000

Out

 Total incoming:  ~ £850,000

Loans in

Loans out

Match details

Pre-season friendly

League One

League table

Results round by round

Matches

Football League Cup

Football League Trophy

FA Cup

Squad statistics

Appearances and goals

|-
!colspan="16"|Players who appeared for Colchester who left during the season

|}

Goalscorers

Disciplinary record

Captains
Number of games played as team captain.

Clean sheets
Number of games goalkeepers kept a clean sheet.

Player debuts
Players making their first-team Colchester United debut in a fully competitive match.

See also
List of Colchester United F.C. seasons

References

General

Specific

2009-10
2009–10 Football League One by team